Md. Rahamat Ali (16 September 1945 – 16 February 2020) was a Bangladesh Awami League politician and lawyer who was elected as a member of the Jatiya Sangsad from Gazipur-1 and Gazipur-3 constituencies. He was the state minister of Ministry of Local Government, Rural Development and Co-operatives. His daughter Rumana Ali is a member of the Jatiya Sangsad. His eldest son M. Zahid Hasan is a renowned physicist.

Early life
Ali was born on 16 September 1945. He earned Master of Arts and law degrees.

Career
Ali was elected as a member of the Jatiya Sangsad from Gazipur-1 in 1991, 1996 and 2001. Later, he was elected as a member of the Jatiya Sangsad from Gazipur-3 in 2008 and 2014. He also served as the state minister of Ministry of Local Government, Rural Development and Co-operatives from 1999 to 2001. He was the chairman of the parliamentary standing committee on Ministry of Local Government, Rural Development and Co-operatives as well.

Death
Ali died on 16 February 2020 at Square Hospital in Dhaka at the age of 74.

References

1945 births
2020 deaths
People from Gazipur District
20th-century Bangladeshi lawyers
Awami League politicians
5th Jatiya Sangsad members
7th Jatiya Sangsad members
8th Jatiya Sangsad members
9th Jatiya Sangsad members
10th Jatiya Sangsad members
State Ministers of Local Government, Rural Development and Co-operatives